James Max Spann Jr. (born June 6, 1956) is a television meteorologist and podcast host based in Birmingham, Alabama. He currently works for WBMA-LD (ABC 33/40), Birmingham's ABC affiliate. Spann has worked in the field since 1978, and is often praised for his easy-to-understand and likely life-saving forecasting during the destructive 2011 Super Outbreak. He is also the host of the weekly podcast WeatherBrains which he started in 2006.

Early life
Spann was born on June 6, 1956 in Huntsville, Alabama to Max and Carolyn Spann (1932–2018). As a child, he and his family moved to Greenville in Butler County. His mother worked as a secretary at Greenville High School, while his father sold lumber.

When Spann was 7, his father left the family, leaving Carolyn to raise him. After Spann finished the fourth grade, he and his mother moved to Tuscaloosa, so that his mother could complete her education at the University of Alabama and become a schoolteacher.

Career
Spann began his broadcast career in Tuscaloosa in 1973 at WTBC radio. There, in high school, he worked the night shift, while former ABC 33/40 anchor Dave Baird worked mornings. Spann volunteered many hours following the 1974 Alabama tornadoes in Jasper. He began his television career in the summer of 1978 at 33/40 predecessor WCFT in Tuscaloosa, the "33" in 33/40.  In fall 1978, Spann moved to WSFA in Montgomery as weekend sports anchor and part-time weatherman.  After spending the summer of 1979 as afternoon-drive announcer at Top 40 station WHHY-FM ("Y102") in Montgomery, he was hired at WAPI-TV in Birmingham as chief weatherman, despite having no formal weather education.  At the age of 23, he was one of the youngest chief weathermen in the country.

Channel 13 was sold to Times Mirror in 1980 and renamed WVTM-TV, and Spann impressed his new bosses enough that they moved him to sister station KDFW in Dallas in 1984.  In 1985, he was named the best weathercaster in the Metroplex by the Dallas Press Club, defeating such competition as KXAS-TV's Harold Taft and WFAA-TV's Troy Dungan.  After only two years, he returned to Alabama as part owner of a small AM-FM radio station combo in Demopolis with Dave Baird. He returned to television in October 1989 as chief weatherman at Birmingham's WBRC-TV.  At the same time, he enrolled in Mississippi State University's meteorology program, earning the NWA and AMS seals of approval upon his graduation.

Spann left WBRC in 1996 to the newly formed ABC 33/40, which had merged WCFT with WJSU-TV in Anniston and a new low-power repeater in Birmingham (WBMA-LD), and had replaced WBRC as Birmingham's ABC affiliate.  He has been at ABC 33/40 ever since.

Spann is the founder of The Weather Factory (formerly The Weather Company) which provides broadcast weather forecasts for a number of radio stations and weather data for industrial and business clients

Starting in 2007, Spann could be heard by listeners of the syndicated Rick and Bubba Show. He is also the chairman and one of the founders of AllWorship.com, a non-profit organization webcasting three streaming radio stations which feature worship music in English and Spanish. The organization grew out of WRRS/Reality Radio, a commercial FM radio station that broadcast Contemporary Christian music in the Birmingham market from 2000 to 2001. He is also the host of WeatherBrains, a weekly weather podcast and board chairman of the Children's Hospital of Alabama. 

During the March 25, 2021 tornado outbreak multiple intense tornadoes struck central Alabama, including a low-end EF3 tornado that damaged Spann's home.

Awards
Spann was the 33rd person in America to receive the AMS distinction as a Certified Broadcast Meteorologist.

He won an Emmy Award with John Oldshue from the National Academy of Television Arts and Sciences for live coverage of a deadly tornado in Tuscaloosa on December 16, 2000. (A camera mounted on the transmitter tower of the former Channel 33 captured live images of the tornado as it moved through the community.) The station won an Edward R. Murrow Award for this coverage.

Spann received two major national awards following his live coverage of the April 2011 tornado super outbreak, which claimed over 250 lives, and had over 50 tornadoes. The National Weather Association named him Broadcaster of the Year, in recognition of his "passionate dedication to serving the Central Alabama community with critical weather information for over 30 years, especially during the deadly April 27, 2011, tornado outbreak". The American Meteorological Society also awarded Spann the Award for Broadcast Meteorology "for his tireless efforts to advance the public's awareness of, and engagement in, the science of meteorology, particularly severe weather forecasting and response."

Global warming
In January 2007, Spann  gained notoriety as a climate change denier. He asserts that climate change is naturally caused, as part of the climate's cyclical nature.  However, in more recent years Spann has taken a more publicly neutral stance on the topic, refraining from going in-depth when pressed about climate change in more modern interviews. In a VICE news interview from 2018, Spann told the host that "I do weather, not climate" and that they should "ask a climatologist" for more information.

Spann's original viewpoints have been criticized by many in the meteorology community. In a blog post for Inside Climate News, Katherine Bagley explained that the short-term models used by many TV weather forecasters are too short-term to demonstrate long-term climate patterns, and that most meteorology degrees do not include any education on climate or climate change.

Spann asserted in 2007 that it is money from research grants rather than genuine science that fuels support for the global warming hypothesis:

Billions of dollars of grant money is flowing into the pockets of those on the man-made global warming bandwagon. No man-made global warming, the money dries up. This is big money, make no mistake about it. Always follow the money trail and it tells a story. Even the lady at "The Weather Channel" probably gets paid good money for a prime time show on climate change. No man-made global warming, no show, and no salary. Nothing wrong with making money at all, but when money becomes the motivation for a scientific conclusion, then we have a problem. For many, global warming is a big cash grab.

Spann was countering a statement made by Heidi Cullen, a staff meteorologist with The Weather Channel, who had written that those who disagreed with the view that global warming was caused by man-made events should not be given the Seal of Approval by the American Meteorological Society. Spann's remarks in his station's weather blog were linked to by the Drudge Report, which thrust Spann — a well-known personality in north and central Alabama, but little known outside that area — into the larger spotlight. As of 2011, Spann has the most followers on Twitter and the most fans on Facebook of any local television meteorologist.

Spann is also a signatory of the Cornwall Alliance for the Stewardship of Creation's "An Evangelical Declaration on Global Warming". Which states: "We believe Earth and its ecosystems — created by God's intelligent design and infinite power and sustained by His faithful providence — are robust, resilient, self-regulating, and self-correcting, admirably suited for human flourishing, and displaying His glory.  Earth's climate system is no exception."

See also
 The Weather Channel: 2007 global warming controversy

References

External links
Spann's official web site
Spann's bio at ABC 33/40
James Spann article at BhamWiki.com

1956 births
Living people
Weather presenters
American television meteorologists
American Christians
People from Birmingham, Alabama
People from Greenville, Alabama
People from Tuscaloosa, Alabama
People from Huntsville, Alabama